Aymeric Picaud was a 12th-century French scholar, monk and pilgrim from Parthenay-le-Vieux in Poitou. He is most widely known today as being the suspected author of the Codex Calixtinus, an illuminated manuscript giving background information for pilgrims travelling the Way of St. James. In essence, he wrote one of the earliest known tourist guidebooks.

Aymeric's Basque material
Among Basque scholars, Aymeric's account of his journey to Santiago de Compostela (around the year 1140) is considered as highly important for the history of the Basque language because it contains some of the earliest Basque words and phrases.

The words and phrases he recorded are:

andrea 'lady (of the house)' (modern andrea)
Andrea Maria, glossed as 'mother of God'
 'meat' (modern )
 'fish' (modern )
 'wine', assumed to represent nasalised  (modern ardo, ardũ in the Souletin dialect, from older ardano)
 'dart' (modern )
 'the priest' (modern  'sacristan')
 'the house' (modern )
 'to church' (modern , elizera in some dialects)
 'the king' (modern , erregia in some dialects)
 'wheat' (modern )
 'the master' (modern )
 'St James' (modern Jauna Done Iakue)
 'bread' (modern )
Urcia, glossed as 'God' by Picaud (see Urtzi)
 'any water' (modern )

References
Etxegoien, J. Orhipean, Gure Herria ezagutzen Xamar: 1996
Aymeric Picaud, Codex Calixtinus facsimile. www.codexcalixtinusfacsimil.com

Basque culture
Basque language
Camino de Santiago
12th-century Christian texts
12th-century French writers
People from Poitou-Charentes
12th-century travelers
12th-century travel writers
French travel writers
Latin-language writers from France